Ulopa reticulata is the species of bugs from Cicadellidae family.

Descriptrion 
It is marked with twolightly coloured bands across the wings, 
| superfamilia = Membracoidea
| familia = Cicadellidae
and sometimes with a third one at the lower base.

Habitat 
The species feed on Erica and Calluna, mostly eating the base of the plant.

References 

Ulopinae
Hemiptera of Europe